Marianne Jodoin (born January 12, 1993) is a Canadian former professional tennis player. She was doubles champion at the $50,000 Toronto Challenger in 2009 (with Maureen Drake).

Jodoin grew up in Varennes and had her breakthrough in junior tennis when she won the Canadian national U-16 indoor championships. In 2010 she qualified for the junior draw of the Australian Open and represented Canada at the Summer Youth Olympics in Singapore.  For the next four years she played collegiate tennis in the United States, for Fresno State and Duke University. She went on to pursue postgraduate studies back in Canada instead of a career in professional tennis.

ITF Circuit finals

Doubles: 1 (1–0)

References

External links
 
 

1993 births
Living people
Canadian female tennis players
Racket sportspeople from Quebec
People from Varennes, Quebec
Fresno State Bulldogs women's tennis players
Duke Blue Devils women's tennis players
Tennis players at the 2010 Summer Youth Olympics